Wajihuddin Ahmed (born 1 December 1938) is a retired senior justice of the Supreme Court of Pakistan, human rights activist, and former professor of law at the Sindh Muslim Law College.

Prior to be elevated as Senior Justice of the Supreme Court, he briefly tenured as the Chief Justice of the Sindh High Court from 1998 until refusing to take oath in opposition to martial law in 1999. He remained a strong critic of President Pervez Musharraf, eventually taking up a leading role in Lawyer's movement in 2007 to oppose President Musharraf. Ultimately, he unsuccessfully ran for the presidential elections held in 2007. Since 2011, he was active in national politics through Pakistan Tehreek-e-Insaf (PTI), being the party's candidate for the presidential election 2013. He lost the election on 30 July 2013 to Mamnoon Hussain of Pakistan Muslim League (N).

In 2016, he left Pakistan Tehreek-e-Insaf.

Biography

Education and lectureship
Wajihuddin Ahmed was born into an Urdu-speaking practising lawyer family in New Delhi, British India, on 1 December 1938. His father, Waheeduddin Ahmed, was also a jurist and had held a prestigious in Delhi High Court; his family migrated to Pakistan after independence in 1947. His father, Waheeduddin Ahmed, rose up to become a respected judge, eventually securing appointments as Chief Justice of Sindh High Court and subsequently appointed as senior justice of Supreme Court of Pakistan.

Upon settling in Karachi, Wajihuddin Ahmed attended and matriculated from Sindh Islamic Monastery, moving Lahore Punjab for his further studies. He enrolled at the Forman Christian College University where he attained BA in Liberal Arts in 1962. In 1963, he enrolled in Sindh Muslim College to read law and eventually graduated with LLB degree in 1966. In 1967, he began his doctoral studies in law at the Karachi University; he was awarded JD degree by Karachi University in 1971.

He avoided holding any judicial office, whether elected or appointed, during his father's tenure as a judge. Therefore, he remained associated with the SM College as a professor of law, delivering lectures and teaching law for undergraduate and post-graduate level courses.

Career
Son of highly reputed Chief Justice of West Pakistan High Court and Judge of the Supreme Court of Pakistan, Justice Waheeduddin Ahmed, Justice Wajih enrolled as an advocate of the Sindh High Court and remained Lecturer at the SM Law College for LL. B. and LL. M. classes. He was consecutively elected as president Sindh High Court Bar Association unopposed in 1977 and 1978 and elected President of Karachi Bar association in 1981. Advocate Wajih was appointed Standing Council for Federal Government in 1984 and Advocate General Sindh on 19 November 1986 and elevated to the Bench of the SHC as a Judge in 1988. He became the Chief Justice of the Sindh High Court from 5 November 1997 to 4 May 1998 and moved to the Supreme Court in 1998. During his tenure as SHC CJ, most sou moto actions were taken. He acted as Returning Officer during 1997 Presidential Elections and then appeared as presidential candidate against Musharraf in 2007.
Justice Wajih joined the Pakistan Tehreek-e-Insaf (PTI) on 10 January 2011.

2013 Presidential election
On 30 July 2013, he was the only opponent of Mamnoon Hussain to become the next president of Pakistan. Ahmed received 77 votes and Hussain got 432 votes.

See also
 Supreme Court of Pakistan

Notes

References
http://www.ahmed-co.com/people
http://www.dawn.com/2007/09/25/top2.htm
http://jang.com.pk/jang/sep2007-daily/25-09-2007/main.htm
http://thenews.jang.com.pk/top_story_detail.asp?Id=10291

1938 births
Living people
People from Delhi
Muhajir people
Forman Christian College alumni
University of Karachi alumni
Academic staff of the University of Karachi
Chief Justices of the Sindh High Court
20th-century Pakistani judges
Pakistani activists
21st-century Pakistani lawyers
Lawyers from Karachi
Pakistan Tehreek-e-Insaf politicians
Sindh Muslim Law College alumni
Justices of the Supreme Court of Pakistan
St. Patrick's High School, Karachi alumni